Luís Santos (2 January 1980) is a Brazilian professional mixed martial artist competing in the Welterweight division He last fought for ONE Championship. A professional competitor since 2000, Santos has also formerly competed for Bellator, the WEC, and the XFC.

Mixed martial arts career

Early career
Santos made his professional MMA debut in a one-night tournament at Tournament of Gladiators 5 in 2000; he won all three of his fights. Santos amassed a record of 18-0 before suffering his first loss in 2005. Although fighting primarily in his native Brazil, Santos did make his U.S. MMA debut on WEC 34 in 2008.

Santos has a black belt in Brazilian Jiu-Jitsu from Team Nogueira. He currently teaches and trains at American Top Team in Coconut Creek but is originally from Belem, Brazil.  Before signing with Bellator, Santos was ranked #5 on the Bloody Elbow world MMA scouting report.

Bellator
In January 2011, it was announced that Santos had signed with Bellator.

Santos debuted for the promotion in the Bellator Season Five Welterweight Tournament. He fought Dan Hornbuckle in the opening round held at Bellator 49 and won the fight via unanimous decision.

Santos lost in the semifinals at Bellator 53 to Ben Saunders via third-round submission.

Santos faced Ryan Ford at Bellator 67. He lost via second-round TKO.

Xtreme Fighting Championships
Santos faced UFC vet Shamar Bailey at XFC 23 on April 19, 2013. He won the fight via TKO at just over a minute into the first round.

Santos next opponent is Dave Courchaine at XFC 24 on June 14. He won via KO in just ten seconds.

Santos faced Justin Davis at XFC 26: Night of Champions III on October 18, 2013. He won the fight via KO at 0:33 in the first round.

Santos faced Alfredo Morales at XFC International 3 on March 29, 2014. He won via front kick knockout in the third round.

ONE Championship
Santos faced Bakhtiyar Abbasov at ONE FC: Battle of the Lions on November 7, 2014. He struck Abbasov in the body with a knee causing him to tap out in the first round.

Santos faced Ben Askren in the main event at ONE Championship: Valor of Champions April 24.  The fight was ruled "No Contest" after an eye poke from Askren at 2:19 of round 1 rendered Santos unable to continue.

Personal life
Santos is married to fellow MMA fighter Carina Damm.

Mixed martial arts record

|-
| Loss
| align=center| 65–12–1 (1)
| James Nakashima
| TKO (retirement)
| ONE Championship: Roots of Honor
| 
| align=center| 2
| align=center| 0:56
| Manila, Philippines
|
|-
| Win
| align=center| 65–11–1 (1)
| Daichi Abe
| TKO (body kick)
| ONE FC: Pursuit of Greatness
| 
| align=center| 1
| align=center| 0:33
| Yangon, Myanmar
|
|-
| Loss
| align=center| 64–11–1 (1)
| Tyler McGuire
| Decision (unanimous)
| ONE Championship: Pursuit of Power
| 
| align=center| 3
| align=center| 5:00
| Kuala Lumpur, Malaysia
| 
|-
| Win
| align=center| 64–10–1 (1)
| Kiamrian Abbasov  
| Decision (unanimous)
| ONE Championship: Visions of Victory
| 
| align=center| 3
| align=center| 5:00
| Kuala Lumpur, Malaysia
| 
|-
| Loss
| align=center| 63–10–1 (1)
| Zebaztian Kadestam
| KO (knees)
| ONE Championship: Dynasty of Heroes
| 
| align=center| 3
| align=center| 2:18
| Kallang, Singapore
| Return to Welterweight (185 lbs).
|-
| Win
| align=center| 63–9–1 (1)
| Igor Svirid
| Decision (unanimous)
| ONE Championship: Titles and Titans
| 
| align=center| 3
| align=center| 5:00
| Jakarta, Indonesia
| Middleweight (205 lbs) debut.
|-
| Win
| align=center| 62–9–1 (1)
| Rafael Silva
| TKO (knee and soccer kicks)
| ONE Championship: Tribe of Warriors
| 
| align=center| 1
| align=center| 1:17
| Jakarta, Indonesia
| Welterweight (185 lbs) debut.
|-
| NC
| align=center| 61–9–1 (1)
| Ben Askren
| NC (accidental eye poke)
| ONE Championship: Valor of Champions
| 
| align=center| 1
| align=center| 2:19
| Pasay, Philippines
| 
|-
| Win
| align=center| 61–9–1
| Bakhtiyar Abbasov
| Submission (knee to body)
| ONE FC: Battle of the Lions
| 
| align=center| 1
| align=center| 0:53
| Kallang, Singapore
| 
|-
| Win
| align=center| 60–9–1
| Alfredo Morales
| KO (front kick)
| XFC International 3
| 
| align=center| 3
| align=center| 1:34
| Osasco, São Paulo, Brazil
| 
|-
| Win
| align=center| 59–9–1
| Edilson Moreira Alves
| Submission (kneebar)
| Inka Fighting Championship 24
| 
| align=center| 1
| align=center| 3:00
| Lima, Peru
| 
|-
| Win
| align=center| 58–9–1
| Justin Davis
| KO (head kick and punches)
| XFC 26: Night of Champions III
| 
| align=center| 1
| align=center| 0:33
| Nashville, Tennessee, United States
| 
|-
| Win
| align=center| 57–9–1
| Dave Courchaine
| KO (head kick and punches)
| XFC 24: Collision Course
| 
| align=center| 1
| align=center| 0:10
| Tampa, Florida, United States
| 
|-
| Win
| align=center| 56–9–1
| Sebastian Latorre
| TKO (knees and punches)
| Smash Fight
| 
| align=center| 1
| align=center| 1:22
| Curitiba, Paraná, Brazil
| 
|-
| Win
| align=center| 55–9–1
| Shamar Bailey
| TKO (head kick and punches)
| XFC 23: Louisville Slugfest
| 
| align=center| 1
| align=center| 1:02
| Louisville, Kentucky, United States
| 
|-
| Loss
| align=center| 54–9–1
| Ryan Ford
| TKO (knee and punches)
| Bellator 67
| 
| align=center| 2
| align=center| 1:24
| Rama, Ontario, Canada
| 
|-
| Loss
| align=center| 54–8–1
| Ben Saunders
| Submission (americana)
| Bellator 53
| 
| align=center| 3
| align=center| 1:45
| Miami, Oklahoma, United States
| 
|-
| Win
| align=center| 54–7–1
| Dan Hornbuckle
| Decision (unanimous)
| Bellator 49
| 
| align=center| 3
| align=center| 5:00
| |Atlantic City, New Jersey, United States
| 
|-
| Draw
| align=center| 53–7–1
| Carlos Alexandre Pereira
| Draw
| AF: Amazon Fight 8
| 
| align=center| 3
| align=center| 5:00
| Belém, Brazil
| 
|-
|  Win
| align=center| 53–7
| Nicolae Cury
| Decision (unanimous)
| Bellator 45
| 
| align=center| 3
| align=center| 5:00
| |Lake Charles, Louisiana, USA
| 
|-
| Win
| align=center| 52–7
| Dave Lehr Cochran
| KO (punch)
| Rumble Time Promotions: Explosion
| 
| align=center| 1
| align=center| 0:46
| |St. Charles, Missouri, USA
| 
|-
| Win
| align=center| 51–7
| William Dias
| Decision (unanimous)
| MSF: Master Super Fight
| 
| align=center| 3
| align=center| 5:00
| Belém, Brazil
| 
|-
| Win
| align=center| 50–7
| Ivan Jorge
| KO (knee)
| AF: Amazon Fight 5
| 
| align=center| 1
| align=center| 0:52
| Belém, Brazil
| 
|-
| Win
| align=center| 49–7
| Pedro Irie
| Submission (arm-triangle choke)
| AF: Amazon Fight 4
| 
| align=center| 2
| align=center| 3:59
| Belém, Brazil
| 
|-
| Win
| align=center| 48–7
| Yuri Fraga
| KO (punch)
| AF: Amazon Fight 3
| 
| align=center| 1
| align=center| N/A
| Belém, Brazil
| 
|-
|  Win
| align=center| 47–7
| Johnny Vigo
| TKO (punches)
| AF: Amazon Fight 2
| 
| align=center| 2
| align=center| N/A
| Belém, Brazil
| 
|-
| Win
| align=center| 46–7
| Elias Monteiro
| TKO (punches)
| NSFC: Naja Super Fight Championship
| 
| align=center| 3
| align=center| 5:00
| |Salinopolis, Brazil
| 
|-
| Loss
| align=center| 45–7
| Adriano Martins
| Decision (split)
| HTJ: Hero's The Jungle 3
| 
| align=center| 3
| align=center| 5:00
| Tokyo, Japan
| 
|-
| Win
| align=center| 45–6
| Shelton Arnaldo
| TKO (punches)
| SF: Nocaute Super Fight
| 
| align=center| 1
| align=center| 1:20
| Belém, Brazil
| 
|-
| Win
| align=center| 44–6
| Norberto dos Santos Neres
| Decision (unanimous)
| SVT: Super Vale Tudo 4
| 
| align=center| 3
| align=center| 5:00
| Belém, Brazil
| 
|-
| Win
| align=center| 43–6
| Wellington Penelva
| KO (punches)
| DFC: Dragon Fight Championship
| 
| align=center| 1
| align=center| 3:00
| Castanhal, Brazil
| 
|-
| Win
| align=center| 42–6
| Predador do Maranhao
| KO (punches)
| SF: Super Fight Belem
| 
| align=center| 1
| align=center| 1:10
| Belém, Brazil
| 
|-
| Loss
| align=center| 41–6
| Daniel Trindade
| Decision (split)
| RSF 4: Roraima Show Fight 4
| 
| align=center| 3
| align=center| 5:00
| Boa Vista, Brazil
| 
|-
| Win
| align=center| 41–5
| Pedro Paulo de Jesus
| Decision (unanimous)
| KJC: The King of Jungle Championship
| 
| align=center| 3
| align=center| 5:00
| Belém, Brazil
| 
|-
| Loss
| align=center| 40–5
| Alex Serdyukov
| TKO (corner stoppage)
| WEC 34
| 
| align=center| 1
| align=center| 5:00
| Sacramento, California, United States
| 
|-
| Loss
| align=center| 40–4
| Carlos Alexandre Fereira
| Decision (unanimous)
| MF: Midway Fight
| 
| align=center| 3
| align=center| 5:00
| Belém, Brazil
| 
|-
| Win
| align=center| 40–3
| Silmar Nunes
| KO (punches)
| Badboy: Super Fight Nocaute
| 
| align=center| 1
| align=center| N/A
| Ananindeua, Brazil
| 
|-
| Win
| align=center| 39–3
| Jorge Patino
| Decision (unanimous)
| MF: Midway Fight
| 
| align=center| 3
| align=center| 5:00
| Belém, Brazil
| 
|-
| Win
| align=center| 38–3
| Rodrigo Ferreira
| KO (punches)
| Badboy: Super Fight Nocaute
| 
| align=center| 1
| align=center| N/A
| Ananindeua, Brazil
| 
|-
| Win
| align=center| 37–3
| Daniel Acacio
| Decision (unanimous)
| SDDS: Super Desafio do Sal Vale Tudo
| 
| align=center| 3
| align=center| 5:00
| Salinópolis, Brazil
| 
|-
| Win
| align=center| 36–3
| Menix Belchoir
| KO (punch)
| MF: Midway Fight
| 
| align=center| 1
| align=center| 4:02
| Belém, Brazil
| 
|-
|  Win
| align=center| 35–3
| Shelton Arnaldo
| TKO (elbows)
| DDT: Duelo de Titas
| 
| align=center| 2
| align=center| 3:20
| Teresina, Brazil
| 
|-
| Win
| align=center| 34–3
| Josenildo Rodrigues de Oliveira
| Decision (unanimous)
| MF: Midway Fight
| 
| align=center| 3
| align=center| 5:00
| Belém, Brazil
| 
|-
| Loss
| align=center| 33–3
| Yoshiyuki Yoshida
| TKO (corner stoppage)
| Kokoro: Kill Or Be Killed
| 
| align=center| 1
| align=center| 5:00
| Tokyo, Japan
| 
|-
| Win
| align=center| 33–2
| Andre Ricardo dos Santos Goncalves
| Decision (unanimous)
| UCVT: Ultimate Combat Vale Tudo
| 
| align=center| 3
| align=center| 5:00
| Belém, Brazil
|
|-
| Win
| align=center| 32–2
| Messias Pai de Santo
| KO (punches)
| SVT: Super Vale Tudo 4
| 
| align=center| 2
| align=center| N/A
| Belém, Brazil
| 
|-
| Win
| align=center| 31–2
| Celio Santos
| TKO (doctor stoppage)
| CDL: Clube da Luta 5
| 
| align=center| 1
| align=center| 0:48
| Salvador, Brazil
| 
|-
| Win
| align=center| 30–2
| David Cubas
| Decision (unanimous)
| GC 2: El Choque
| 
| align=center| 3
| align=center| 5:00
| Lima, Peru
| 
|-
| Win
| align=center| 29–2
| Alexandre Nunes Brandao
| Decision (unanimous)
| SC: Super Combat
| 
| align=center| 3
| align=center| 5:00
| Capanema, Brazil
| 
|-
| Win
| align=center| 28–2
| Gabriel Castro
| KO (knee)
| RK: Roraima Kombat
| 
| align=center| 1
| align=center| 1:30
| Boa Vista, Brazil
| 
|-
| Win
| align=center| 27–2
| Claudio do Boxe
| Submission (rear-naked choke)
| SDDS: Super Desafio do Sal Vale Tudo
| 
| align=center| 2
| align=center| 4:32
| Rio de Janeiro, Brazil
| 
|-
| Win
| align=center| 26–2
| Aloisio Freitas Neto
| Decision (unanimous)
| RC 2: Roraima Combat 2
| 
| align=center| 3
| align=center| 5:00
| Boa Vista, Brazil
| 
|-
| Win
| align=center| 25–2
| Ildemar Alcântara
| Decision (unanimous)
| MCVT: Mega Combat Vale Tudo
| 
| align=center| 3
| align=center| 5:00
| Belém, Brazil
| 
|-
| Win
| align=center| 24–2
| Gerson Cordeiro
| Submission (rear-naked choke)
| UCVT: Ultimate Combat Vale Tudo
| 
| align=center| 3
| align=center| N/A
| Belém, Brazil
| 
|-
| Win
| align=center| 23–2
| Edvan Souza
| TKO (punches)
| WC: World Combat 4
| 
| align=center| 1
| align=center| 2:15
| São Luís, Brazil
| 
|-
| Win
| align=center| 22–2
| Joel Leao
| KO (punches)
| SRVT: Super Radikal Vale Tudo
| 
| align=center| 1
| align=center| N/A
| Belém, Brazil
| 
|-
| Loss
| align=center| 21–2
| Ildemar Alcântara
| Submission (triangle choke)
| IMVT: Iron Man Vale Tudo 7
| 
| align=center| 2
| align=center| 4:51
| Macapá, Brazil
| 
|-
| Win
| align=center| 21–1
| Ali Negro
| Submission (armbar)
| WC: World Combat 3
| 
| align=center| 2
| align=center| 3:40
| São Luís, Brazil
| 
|-
| Win
| align=center| 20–1
| Gabriel Castro
| KO (punches)
| RC 1: Roraima Combat 1
| 
| align=center| 1
| align=center| N/A
| Boa Vista, Brazil
| 
|-
| Win
| align=center| 19–1
| Junior Eladio
| KO (punches)
| WC: World Combat 2
| 
| align=center| 1
| align=center| N/A
| São Luís, Brazil
| 
|-
| Win
| align=center| 18–1
| Ali Negro
| KO (punches)
| UCVT: Ultimate Combat Vale Tudo
| 
| align=center| 2
| align=center| 2:56
| Belém, Brazil
| 
|-
| Win
| align=center| 17–1
| Marcio Bomba
| KO (punch)
| SDDS: Super Desafio do Sal Vale Tudo
| 
| align=center| 2
| align=center| 3:50
| Salinópolis, Brazil
| 
|-
| Win
| align=center| 16–1
| Savio Maia
| KO (punch)
| Desafio: Interestadual Estrela
| 
| align=center| 2
| align=center| 3:00
| Belém, Brazil
| 
|-
|  Win
| align=center| 15–1
| Joao Bosco
| Technical Submission (triangle choke)
| Desafio: Physical Vale Tudo
| 
| align=center| 2
| align=center| N/A
| Belém, Brazil
| 
|-
| Win
| align=center| 14–1
| Rosinaldo Costa
| KO (punches)
| Desafio: Physical Vale Tudo
| 
| align=center| 2
| align=center| N/A
| Belém, Brazil
| 
|-
| Win
| align=center| 13–1
| Magno Silva de Sousa
| Submission (armbar)
| Desafio: Physical Vale Tudo
| 
| align=center| 2
| align=center| N/A
| Belém, Brazil
| 
|-
| Loss
| align=center| 12–1
| Simao Melo da Silva
| TKO (submission to punches)
| IMVT: Iron Man Vale Tudo 2
| 
| align=center| 2
| align=center| N/A
| Macapa, Amapa, Brazil
| 
|-
| Win
| align=center| 12–0
| Damian Damian
| KO (punches)
| UCVT: Ultimate Combat Vale Tudo
| 
| align=center| 2
| align=center| N/A
| Belém, Brazil
| 
|-
| Win
| align=center| 11–0
| Luiz Falcão
| Decision (unanimous)
| Super Combate: MMA Fight
| 
| align=center| 3
| align=center| 5:00
| Belém, Brazil
| 
|-
| Win
| align=center| 10–0
| Fabiano Rabugento
| TKO (body punch)
| SDDS: Super Desafio do Sal Vale Tudo
| 
| align=center| 1
| align=center| 3:50
| Salinópolis, Brazil
| 
|-
| Win
| align=center| 9–0
| Alex Karate
| TKO (punches)
| NNEVTC: North-Northeast Vale Tudo Championship
| 
| align=center| 1
| align=center| 3:40
| São Luís, Brazil
| 
|-
| Win
| align=center| 8–0
| Fabio Fabio
| Submission (rear-naked choke)
| FCVT: Fort Combat Vale Tudo
| 
| align=center| 1
| align=center| N/A
| Macapa, Amapa, Brazil
| 
|-
| Win
| align=center| 7–0
| Wellington Geraldo de Oliveira
| KO (punches)
| SVT: Super Vale Tudo 3
| 
| align=center| 1
| align=center| N/A
| Belém, Brazil
| 
|-
| Win
| align=center| 6–0
| Claudio do Boxe
| Submission (rear-naked choke)
| Badboy: Acai Fight
| 
| align=center| 1
| align=center| 3:50
| Macapa, Amapa, Brazil
| 
|-
| Win
| align=center| 5–0
| Claudio Indio Guerreiro
| Submission (armbar)
| IPF: I Piaui Fight
| 
| align=center| 1
| align=center| 3:50
| Brazil
| 
|-
| Win
| align=center| 4–0
| Ronaldo Marcio Azevedo
| TKO (punches)
| Badboy: Rider de Vale Tudo
| 
| align=center| 1
| align=center| 4:30
| Belém, Brazil
| 
|-
| Win
| align=center| 3–0
| Rerison Araujo
| Submission (rear-naked choke)
| TOF: Tournament of Gladiators 5
| 
| align=center| 1
| align=center| 4:30
| Nova Friburgo, Brazil
| 
|-
| Win
| align=center| 2–0
| Montanha
| KO (punches)
| TOF: Tournament of Gladiators 5
| 
| align=center| 1
| align=center| 4:00
| Nova Friburgo, Brazil
| 
|-
| Win
| align=center| 1–0
| Felix Felix
| KO (punches)
| TOF: Tournament of Gladiators 5
| 
| align=center| 1
| align=center| 3:40
| Nova Friburgo, Brazil
|

References

External links

1980 births
Living people
Brazilian male mixed martial artists
Brazilian practitioners of Brazilian jiu-jitsu
People awarded a black belt in Brazilian jiu-jitsu
Welterweight mixed martial artists
Mixed martial artists utilizing Brazilian jiu-jitsu
People from Deerfield Beach, Florida
Sportspeople from Belém